Flying Tigers is the second studio album by heavy metal band White Wizzard, released on September 19, 2011 in Europe and in North America on November 15. Until 2018's Infernal Overdrive, it was the last album to feature Wyatt Anderson on vocals, being released after his departure from the band in June 2011.

While the first half of the album features simple and straightforward songwriting similar to the band's previous album, Over the Top, the last six songs are more progressive in structure and form a single story concept.

Track listing

Personnel
Wyatt "The Screamin' Demon" Anderson - Vocals
Jon Leon - Guitar/Bass
Giovanni Durst - Drums

References

2010 albums
White Wizzard albums
Earache Records albums